Cyanopepla obscura is a moth of the subfamily Arctiinae. It was described by Herbert Druce in 1898. It is found in Peru.

References

Cyanopepla
Moths described in 1898